Dugout was an unincorporated community located in Raleigh County, West Virginia.  Dugout had a post office from 1904–1907.

External links 
West Virginia Place Names

References 

Unincorporated communities in West Virginia
Unincorporated communities in Raleigh County, West Virginia
Coal towns in West Virginia